Kumardubi Darkhuli High School is a Hindi/Englishschool in Baharagora, Jharkhand state, India. The school was established in 1965, and is state-run. Students are provided education up to the 10th grade. The curriculum is based on the standards set by the Jharkhand School Examination Board. For students of grades 7 to 9, the school has developed its own curriculum. Courses include compulsory training in music, fine arts, agriculture, and crafts. Computer studies are also offered.

The school is affiliated with the Jharkhand Academic Council, Ranchi. The school session is from April to the following March.

High schools and secondary schools in Jharkhand
East Singhbhum district
Educational institutions established in 1965
1965 establishments in Bihar